Hind bint al-Nuʿmān, also known as al-Ḥurqah, was a pre-Islamic Arab poet. There is some historiographical debate, going back to the Middle Ages, over precisely what her names were, with corresponding debates over whether some of the bearers of these names were different people or not. An example of a poet-princess, she has been read as a key figure in pre-Islamic poetry.

Biography
Hind was the daughter of al-Nu'man III ibn al-Mundhir, the last Lakhmid king of al-Hirah and a Eastern Christian Arab mother.
According to the Ḥarb Banī Shaybān maʻa Kisrà Ānūshirwān (whose historical reliability is questionable), Khosrow II, emperor of the Sasanian Empire and her father's overlord, demanded Hind in marriage. Thinking better of the arrangement, al-Nuʿmān sent Hind to seek refuge among the Arabs, and was subsequently attacked and imprisoned by Khosrow. After failing to find sanctuary with the Ghassanids and other Arab tribes, Hind was granted sanctuary among the Banu Shayban through the intercession of their princess al-Ḥujayjah. She was then sent to marry al-Nu'man ibn al-Rayyan, "her only cousin to survive the Persian attack on the Kingdom of al-Ḥirah", after which Khosrow granted him the throne of al-Hirah.

Another source of dubious reliability, Ali ibn Nasr al-Katib's Encyclopedia of Pleasure, tells that Hind loved a woman named Hind bint al-Khuss al-Zarqāʾ. When al-Zarqāʾ died, her faithful lover "cropped her hair, wore black clothes, rejected worldly pleasures, vowed to God that she would lead an ascetic life until she passed away". Hind bint al-Nuʿmān even built a monastery to commemorate her love for al-Zarqāʾ. This source figures the two characters as the first lesbians in Arab culture.

Works
Some poetry is attributed to Hind, making her (if the attributions are correct) a relatively rare example of a pre-Islamic female poet whose work survives.

References

6th-century Arabs
7th-century Arabs
6th-century Christians
7th-century Christian nuns
Medieval women poets
Poets of the early Islamic period
Arabic-language women poets
Arabic-language poets
7th-century women writers
7th-century Arabic poets
7th-century deaths
6th-century women writers
6th-century Arabic poets
Arab Christians in Mesopotamia
Christian poets
Church of the East writers
Lakhmids
Arab princesses
Arabs from the Sasanian Empire
One Thousand and One Nights characters